Eetu Pellikka (born 23 February 2000) is a Finnish football player who plays as forward for Kakkonen club HJS Akatemia.

References

2000 births
Living people
Finnish footballers
Finland youth international footballers
Association football forwards
Kuopion Palloseura players
SC Kuopio Futis-98 players
Ekenäs IF players
Myllykosken Pallo −47 players
Veikkausliiga players
Ykkönen players
Kakkonen players